The Villa L'Ambrogiana was a rural palace or villa built during the late-Renaissance by Ferdinand I de' Medici; it is located at the confluence of the rivers Pesa and Arno, in the municipality of Montelupo Fiorentino.

History
Originally, the site was occupied by a casino owned by the Ardinghetti, who sold it to the Corboli, and then to the Medici.  Construction of the present palace took place circa 1587, putatively using designs of Bernardo Buontalenti, and built over a pre-existing structure.  In the 19th century, Leopold II converted the villa into a mental asylum. In 1886, it was converted into a jail for women and minors, and later into a jail for those judged mentally ill. The Villa and grounds in the 17th century were used by Francesco Redi for anatomic studies of leprosy, and by Andrea Scacciati and Bartolomeo Bimbi to create paintings of flora and fauna for the Grand-Duke Cosimo III de' Medici.

Still in use as an institution for psychiatric illness, guided visits to parts of the building can be requested. The last patient leaves the Montelupo Fiorentino facility in the first ten days of February 2017,

In the following months the complex returns from the Ministry of Grace and Justice in availability of the State Property Agency.

In 2017, a public tender was published to study a guide plan for the complex, project edited by the winners of the tender, Coopculture and P&M Architecture.
.

See also
 Medici villas

References

Houses completed in 1587
Gardens in Tuscany
Ambrogiana
Ambrogiana